The Canadian International Heavyweight Championship was the top singles title in the Montreal-based wrestling promotion Lutte Internationale (International Wrestling). It was a continuation of the Montreal Athletic Commission's old International Heavyweight Championship, which became inactive after the Commission's promotion, the International Wrestling Association, closed in 1975. The title lasted from 1976 until Lutte Internationale closed in 1987.

Title history

References

External links
Canadian International Heavyweight title history

Heavyweight wrestling championships
Sport in Montreal
Canadian professional wrestling championships